Linn Run State Park is a Pennsylvania state park on  in Cook and Ligonier Townships, Westmoreland County, Pennsylvania in the United States. The park borders Forbes State Forest.  Two smaller streams, Grove Run and Rock Run, join in Linn Run State Park to form Linn Run which has a waterfall, Adams Falls, which can be seen at the park. This state park is just off Pennsylvania Route 381 near the small town of Rector.

History
The area in and surrounding Linn Run State Park is now a thriving second growth forest. One hundred years ago it was generally described as a "waste land". The ridges of the Allegheny Mountains had once been covered with old-growth forest. These forests were clear cut during the lumber era that swept over most of the mountains and forests of Pennsylvania during the mid-to-late 19th century and very early 20th century. The lumberman stripped the mountains and took the logs to the sawmill where they were cut into lumber. Smaller logs were used to reinforce the mine shafts of the many coal mines throughout southwestern Pennsylvania and West Virginia. The bark of the hemlock tree was used as a source of tannin at the tanneries of the area. The only thing the lumbermen left behind was the treetops. These tree tops were left to dry. The passing steam locomotives of the Pittsburgh, Westmoreland and Somerset Railroad would ignite this dry brush causing massive wildfires that swept through the mountains and valleys. In 1909, after the Commonwealth of Pennsylvania had purchased the land from the lumberman, Forester John R. Williams reported, "I should say that fully three-fifths (60%) of the reserve had been burned since the lumbering was done. The fires did great damage to the young growth. Some places were covered with nothing but ferns and blackberry bushes." Scars from these fires can still be seen today in the Linn Runn area.

Most of the wildlife in the area was devastated due to the destruction of their habitat or over hunting. White-tailed deer were imported from Michigan and New York to reestablish what had once been a thriving population of deer. These deer were released throughout Pennsylvania. The current population of deer in Pennsylvania are descended from the original stock that was introduced in 1910 after the lumberman had moved out of the area.

Recreation

Hiking Trails

All trails at the park are open to hiking. Mountain biking and snowmobiling are not permitted on the hiking trails.

The trail is very rocky and goes by several large boulders. The waterfall is surrounded a stand of hemlock with overhanging rhododendron.
It becomes progressively steeper as is passes along Grove Run.

Hunting and fishing
The most common game species are squirrels, turkey and white-tailed deer. The hunting of groundhogs is prohibited. Hunters are expected to follow the rules and regulations of the Pennsylvania Game Commission. Linn Run is a trout fishery with stocked trout and native brook trout.

Picnics
Linn Run State Park has long been a popular destination for families and church groups for picnicking. There are two main picnic areas at the park. Adams Falls Picnic Area is near Adams Falls. It has a selection of picnic tables, a pavilion, playground and modern restrooms. Grove Run Picnic Area is near Grove Run. It lacks a pavilion but otherwise has the same facilities at the Adams Falls Picnic Area.

Cabins
The cabin area has been designated as the Linn Run State Park Family Cabin District and is listed on the National Register of Historic Places. The older cabins, dating back to 1933, were constructed by the Civilian Conservation Corps during the Great Depression, in an architectural style known as WPA Rustic.

There are ten cabins at Linn Run State Park. Only one of them is modern with a kitchen and bathroom. The other nine cabins are rustic, meaning that there is no indoor plumbing, but they do have basic furniture (bed, table, chairs) as well as wood-burning stoves, electricity, a refrigerator, oven, stove and microwave. Each rustic cabin has an outhouse and water pump. There is a modern bathhouse in the area of the cabins.

Nearby state parks
The following state parks are within  of Linn Run State Park:
Keystone State Park (Westmoreland County)
Kooser State Park (Somerset County)
Laurel Mountain State Park (Westmoreland County)
Laurel Hill State Park (Somerset County)
Laurel Ridge State Park (Cambria, Fayette, Somerset, and Westmoreland counties)
Laurel Summit State Park (Westmoreland County)
Ohiopyle State Park (Fayette County)
Yellow Creek State Park (Indiana County)

References

External links

 

State parks of Pennsylvania
Parks in Westmoreland County, Pennsylvania
Laurel Highlands
Parks in the Pittsburgh metropolitan area
Protected areas established in 1909
1909 establishments in Pennsylvania
Protected areas of Westmoreland County, Pennsylvania